Sant Quirze de Colera is a Benedictine monastery in Rabós, Catalonia, Spain.  The 9th-century building, in First Romanesque style, was declared a Bien de Interés Cultural landmark in 1931.

Bibliography
 DDAA (2005). El Meu País, tots els pobles, viles i ciutats de Catalunya volumen 3. Barcelona, Edicions 62.  (in Catalán).

References

External links

 Monasterio de Sant Quirze de Colera - Monasterios de Catalunya (in Catalan)

Benedictine monasteries in Catalonia
Bien de Interés Cultural landmarks in the Province of Girona
Romanesque architecture in Catalonia